Live At Howlin’ Wolf is a promo EP by the band The Afghan Whigs containing 4 tracks from a live concert from Thanksgiving Night 1997 at The Howlin' Wolf in New Orleans, Louisiana.

Track listing
 "If There’s Hell Below (We’re All Going To Go)" (cover)
 "Blame, Etc."
 "Superstition/Going To Town"
 "Debonair"

References

The Afghan Whigs albums
1998 EPs